Princetown may refer to:
 Princetown, a village on Dartmoor, Devon, England
 Princetown Prison, former name of HM Prison Dartmoor
 Princetown, Caerphilly, a location in Caerphilly County Borough, Wales
 Princeton, Kentucky, founded as Princetown
 Princetown, New York, a town in Schenectady County, New York, United States
 Princetown, Victoria, a small town on the Great Ocean Road in Victoria, Australia

See also
 Princeton (disambiguation)